Shady Grove is a historic home located near Gladys, Campbell County, Virginia.  It was built in 1825, and is a -story, brick Federal-style farmhouse with a gable roof.  The house has double-pile, center-passage plan. The house was built by Paulina Cabell Henry on land inherited from her father, Dr. George Cabell of Point of Honor, Lynchburg, Virginia.

It was listed on the National Register of Historic Places in 1982.

References

Houses on the National Register of Historic Places in Virginia
Federal architecture in Virginia
Houses completed in 1825
Houses in Campbell County, Virginia
National Register of Historic Places in Campbell County, Virginia